The 1928 Democratic National Convention was held at Sam Houston Hall in Houston, Texas, June 26–28, 1928. The keynote speaker was Claude G. Bowers. The convention resulted in the nomination of Governor Alfred E. Smith of New York for president and Senator Joseph T. Robinson of Arkansas for vice president.

The convention was the first held by either party in the South since the Civil War. It was also the first to nominate a Roman Catholic for president, Al Smith. The Texas delegation, led by Governor Dan Moody, was vehemently opposed to Smith. Therefore, when Smith was nominated, they rallied against his anti-prohibition sentiment by fighting for a "dry", prohibitionist platform. Ultimately, the convention pledged "honest enforcement of the Constitution".

Smith became the first Democrat since Reconstruction to lose more than one southern state in the general election, due to his "wet" stance, his opposition to the Ku Klux Klan, and his Catholicism.

Candidates for the nomination before and during the convention

 William A. Ayres, U.S. representative from Kansas
 Theodore G. Bilbo, U.S. senator from Mississippi
 A. Victor Donahey, Governor of Ohio
 Walter F. George, U.S. senator from Georgia
 Pat Harrison, U.S. senator from Mississippi
 James T. Heflin, U.S. senator from Alabama
 Gilbert M. Hitchcock, former U.S. senator from Nebraska
 Cordell Hull, U.S. representative from Tennessee
 Jesse H. Jones, businessman from Texas
 William G. McAdoo, former Treasury Secretary from California
 Edwin T. Meredith, former Agriculture Secretary from Indiana
 Atlee Pomerene, former U.S. senator from Ohio
 Henry T. Rainey, U.S. representative from Illinois
 James A. Reed, U.S. senator from Missouri
 Al Smith, Governor of New York
 Thomas J. Walsh, U.S. senator from Montana
 Richard C. Watts, Chief Justice of the South Carolina Supreme Court
 Evans Woollen, football coach from Indiana

Candidates for the vice presidential nomination
Joseph T. Robinson was chosen as the vice presidential nominee. Among the candidates for nomination were:
 Joseph T. Robinson, Senate Minority Leader from Arkansas
 Henry T. Allen, retired U.S. Army major general from Kentucky
 Alben W. Barkley, U.S. senator from Kentucky
 Lewis Stevenson, son of former Vice President Adlai Stevenson I from Illinois
 George L. Berry, newspaper owner and publisher from Tennessee
 Gilbert Hitchcock, former senator from Nebraska
 Joseph Reed, senator from Missouri
 Atlee Pomerene former senator from Ohio
 Evans Woollen, Bank founder, lawyer - Indiana 
 Cordell Hull, Congressman from Tennessee
 Duncan U. Fletcher, U.S. senator from Florida 
 Daniel Moody, Governor of Texas
 Nellie Davis Tayloe Ross, former Governor of Wyoming
 John H. Taylor
 Joseph P. Tumulty, delegate and former personal secretary to the president from New Jersey

See also
Democratic Party presidential primaries, 1928
List of Democratic National Conventions
U.S. presidential nomination convention
1928 United States presidential election 
1928 Republican National Convention
History of the United States Democratic Party

References

External links 
 Governor Moody and the "Dry" Platform
 Democratic Party Platform of 1928 at The American Presidency Project
 Smith Nomination Acceptance Speech for President at DNC (transcript) at The American Presidency Project

Democratic National Conventions
Democratic
Conventions in Houston
Political conventions in Texas
Texas Democratic Party
1928 United States presidential election
1928 in Texas
1928 conferences
June 1928 events
Al Smith